

See also 
 Lists of fossiliferous stratigraphic units in Europe

References 
 

 France
France geography-related lists